The Grim Reaper is a personification of death.

Grim Reaper(s) may also refer to:

As a nickname

Military
 493rd Fighter Squadron, USAF F-15 Eagle squadron
 VF-10, aviation unit of the US Navy from 1942 to 1945
 VFA-101, US Navy Fleet Replacement Squadron active 1952–2005 and 2012–19

People
 Gregory Scarpa, mafia hitman for the Colombo crime family
 Stu Grimson, Canadian ice hockey player active in the NHL from 1989 to 2002
 Patrick Mahomes, American quarterback for the Kansas City Chiefs
 Mitch McConnell, American politician and Senate Republican leader since 2007

Art and entertainment
 Grim Reaper (band), a British heavy metal band
 "Grim Reaper of Love", a 1966 single by the American rock band The Turtles

Films and television
 Grim Reaper (film), a 2007 horror film
 The Grim Reaper, episode 37 of Thriller (American TV series)
 La commare secca, typically titled in English as The Grim Reaper, a 1962 Italian mystery film directed by Bernardo Bertolucci
 Antropophagus, distributed in the US as The Grim Reaper, a 1980 Italian horror film directed by Joe D'Amato

Characters 
 Grim Reaper (comics), a Marvel Comics supervillain
 Grim Reaper (Nedor Comics), a Nedor Comics hero
 Grim Reaper aka Grim, a character in the animated TV series The Grim Adventures of Billy & Mandy; see List of The Grim Adventures of Billy & Mandy characters

Other
 Grim Reaper (advertisement), a 1987 Australian AIDS awareness campaign
 Grim Reapers Motorcycle Club (Canada), a Canadian outlaw motorcycle club (MC) established in 1967
 Grim Reapers Motorcycle Club (USA), an American outlaw motorcycle club (MC) established in 1965
 The Grim Reaper, an error alert that replaced the Guru Meditation in later versions of AmigaOS

See also
 Reaper (disambiguation)
 Thanatotheristes, a genus of dinosaur, literally "death harvester"